Joseph Oliver (birth unknown – death unknown), also known by the nicknames of "The Points Machine" and "Old Faithful", was an English professional rugby league footballer who played in the 1920s, 1930s and 1940s.

Background
Oliver was born in Maryport, Cumberland, England.

Playing career

Oliver won caps for England while at Batley in 1928 against Wales, and won caps for Great Britain in 1928 against Australia (3 matches), and New Zealand.

Oliver won further caps for England while at Hull in 1933 against Australia, and in 1936 against Wales, and France, He also represented Cumberland.

Oliver played, was captain, and scored two tries, and five conversions in Hull FC's 21-2 victory over Widnes in the Championship Final during the 1935-36 season.

Oliver played, and was captain in Hull FC's victory in the Yorkshire League during the 1935-36 season.

The Hull F.C club song 'Old Faithful' also comes from Joe Oliver's time at the club. Joe was nicknamed 'The Points Machine' and 'Old Faithful' by the club's supporters, due to his consistent and prolific scoring rate. In 1933 when Gene Autry released his song about an 'old faithful' horse the fans adopted it for Joe. The song has adapted slightly since that time but can still be accredited to Joe's time at the club.

Oliver set Hull FC's "Most Career Goals" record with 687-goals, and Hull FC's "Most Career Points" record with 1842-points scored between 1928-37 & 1943-45.

References

External links
 (archived by web.archive.org) Stats → PastPlayers → O at hullfc.com
 (archived by web.archive.org) Statistics at hullfc.com
Search for "Joe Oliver" at britishnewspaperarchive.co.uk
Search for "The Points Machine" at britishnewspaperarchive.co.uk
Search for "Old Faithful" at britishnewspaperarchive.co.uk

Batley Bulldogs players
Cumberland rugby league team players
England national rugby league team players
English rugby league players
Great Britain national rugby league team players
Huddersfield Giants players
Hull F.C. captains
Hull F.C. coaches
Hull F.C. players
Hull Kingston Rovers players
Place of death missing
Rugby league centres
Rugby league fullbacks
Rugby league players from Maryport
Year of birth missing
Year of death missing